Our Lady's High School may refer to:

Our Lady's High School, Broxburn, West Lothian, Scotland
Our Lady's High School, Cumbernauld, North Lanarkshire, Scotland
Our Lady's High School, Motherwell, North Lanarkshire, Scotland
Our Lady's Catholic High School, Fulwood, Lancashire, England
Our Lady's Catholic High School, Stamford Hill, London, England

See also
Our Lady's Secondary School (disambiguation)